The yellow-winged flatbill (Tolmomyias flavotectus), also known as  yellow-winged flycatcher, is a species of bird in the tyrant flycatcher family Tyrannidae. It is found in humid forests to the west of the Andes in north west Ecuador, Colombia, Panama and Costa Rica.

Taxonomy
The yellow-winged flatbill was described by the German ornithologist Ernst Hartert in 1902. He coined the trinomial name Rhynchocyclus megacephala flavotectus and specified the type location as Hacienda Paramba, Imbabura, Ecuador. It was formerly treated as a subspecies of yellow-margined flatbill (Tolmomyias assimilis) which is found to the east of the Andes and has very different vocalization.

References

External links
Xeno-canto: audio recordings of the yellow-margined flatbill (Tolmomyias flavotectus)

Tolmomyias
Birds described in 1902
Birds of Ecuador
Birds of Colombia
Birds of Panama
Birds of Costa Rica